As motorboat racing is a dangerous sport, many individuals (including drivers, crew members, officials and spectators) have been killed in crashes related to the sport, either in a race, in qualifying, in practice or a private testing session.  For example, in offshore powerboat racing, one racer dies each year from accidents.

Accidents during Water speed record

Accidents during an Unlimited Hydroplane race

Accidents during offshore powerboat racing

Accidents during outboard powerboat racing

Accidents during hydroplane and displacement racing

Accidents during drag boat racing

References

External links
http://www.wediditforlove.com/remembering-boats.html

Motorboat racing

Motorboat racing
motorboat racing